School of Rock is an American musical-comedy television series developed by Jim Armogida and Steve Armogida that premiered on Nickelodeon on March 12, 2016. It ran for three seasons, with its final episode airing on April 8, 2018. The series is based on the 2003 film of the same name and stars Breanna Yde, Ricardo Hurtado, Jade Pettyjohn, Lance Lim, Aidan Miner, Tony Cavalero, and Jama Williamson.

Plot 
Set in Austin, Texas, the series follows a group of rule-abiding students who learn to take risks and reach new heights thanks to substitute teacher Dewey Finn, a down-on-his-luck musician who uses the language of rock and roll to inspire his class to form a secret band. Throughout the school year, these middle-school classmates find themselves navigating relationships, discovering their unknown talents and learning lessons on loyalty and friendships.

Episodes

Cast and characters

Main 
 Breanna Yde as Tomika, a 12-year-old schoolgirl who is best friends with classmate Summer. She plays the electric bass and is also the lead singer in the band.
 Ricardo Hurtado as Freddy, a 12-year-old schoolboy who is considered the most handsome guy in his class and plays the drums in the band. His best friends are classmates Zack and Lawrence. Unbeknownst to him, Summer has a huge crush on him. At the end of the second season, he begins to have feelings for her.
 Jade Pettyjohn as Summer, a 12-year-old schoolgirl who is best friends with Tomika and plays the tambourine in the band and also is the manager. She has a crush on Freddy. 
 Lance Lim as Zack, a 12-year-old schoolboy who is best friends with Lawrence and Freddy. He plays the electric guitar.
 Aidan Miner as Lawrence, a 12-year-old schoolboy who is best friends with Zack and Freddy and is considered the smartest kid in his class. He plays the electronic keyboard.
 Tony Cavalero as Mr. Finn, the new substitute teacher and an ex-rock musician who teaches the kids how to play and work together as a band. In the second season, he is promoted to a regular teacher.
 Jama Williamson as Principal Mullins, the principal of the school. In the first season, she is a recurring character, but is promoted to a main character in the second season.

Recurring 
 Ivan Mallon as Clark
 Brec Bassinger as Kale (seasons 2–3)
 Will Kindrachuk as Asher (seasons 2–3)

Production 
In August 2014, Nickelodeon announced a TV series adaptation of School of Rock, and the cast was revealed in March 2015. On April 5, 2016, Nickelodeon announced that School of Rock had been renewed for a 13-episode second season, and actress Breanna Yde announced on her Twitter account that production of season two began April 24, 2016. In April 2016, Jama Williamson was promoted to the regular cast for the series' second season. The second season premiered on Nickelodeon on September 17, 2016. Nickelodeon renewed the series for a 20-episode third season on December 2, 2016. The third season premiered on July 8, 2017. On November 15, 2017, Nickelodeon announced that the third season would be the last. Tony Cavalero reported on social media that the series finale was airing on April 8, 2018. The last episode of the third season as well as the series aired on April 8, 2018.

Release 
On June 25, 2018, it was announced that School of Rock would stream on Hulu.

Ratings 
 

| link2             = List of School of Rock episodes#Season 2 (2016–17)
| episodes2         = 13
| start2            = 
| end2              = 
| startrating2      = 1.34
| endrating2        = 1.18
| viewers2          = |2}} 

| link3             = List of School of Rock episodes#Season 3 (2017–18)
| episodes3         = 20
| start3            = 
| end3              = 
| startrating3      = 1.03
| endrating3        = 0.67
| viewers3          = |2}} 
}}

Awards and nominations

References

External links
 

2016 American television series debuts
2018 American television series endings
2010s American musical comedy television series
2010s Nickelodeon original programming
English-language television shows
Live action television shows based on films
Television series by Paramount Television